Samuel Redgate (27 July 1810 – 13 April 1851) was an English professional cricketer who played for Nottingham Cricket Club and Nottinghamshire sides from the 1830 to the 1846 season.

Redgate was an outstanding rightarm fast bowler using the roundarm style. He batted right-handed and sometimes played as wicket-keeper.

Redgate played in a total of 78 first-class matches and took 426 known wickets. His best performance was 8 wickets for the North of England against MCC at Burton-on-Trent in 1840. He took 5 wickets in an innings 31 times and 10 wickets in a match 11 times.

References

English cricketers
English cricketers of 1826 to 1863
Nottinghamshire cricketers
1810 births
1851 deaths
North v South cricketers
People from Arnold, Nottinghamshire
Cricketers from Nottinghamshire
Marylebone Cricket Club cricketers
Midland Counties cricketers
Gentlemen cricketers
Players cricketers
Nottingham Cricket Club cricketers
Left-Handed v Right-Handed cricketers
Cambridge Town Club cricketers
Players of Nottinghamshire cricketers
Fast v Slow cricketers